The ARIA Music Award for Best Hard Rock or Heavy Metal Album, is an award presented at the annual ARIA Music Awards, which recognises "the many achievements of Aussie artists across all music genres", since 1987. It is handed out by the Australian Recording Industry Association (ARIA), an organisation whose aim is "to advance the interests of the Australian record industry." 
To be eligible, the recording must be an album in the hard rock or heavy metal genres, and cannot be entered in other genre categories. The accolade is voted for by a judging school, which comprises between 40 and 100 members of representatives experienced in this genre, and is given to a solo artist or group who is either from Australia or an Australian resident.

The award for Best Hard Rock or Heavy Metal Album was first presented to Parkway Drive in 2010, for Deep Blue, they won the award again in 2018 for Reverence. The Amity Affliction (2010, 2013, 2014, 2016 & 2020) have received the most nominations more than any other artist or band in this category, with total of 5 nominations. However, Northlane has most awards in this category with 3 awards from 4 nominations, more than any other artist or band in this category.

Winners and nominees
In the following table, the winner is highlighted in a separate colour, and in boldface; the nominees are those that are not highlighted or in boldface.

References

External links
The ARIA Awards Official website

H
A
Album awards